The Kansas City Cowboys  were a professional baseball team based in Kansas City, Missouri, for two seasons in  to  in the American Association. The franchise used Association Park as their home field in 1888, then moved to Exposition Park for the last game that season, and all of 1889.

The team began the 1888 season on April 18 with part-time outfielder Dave Rowe as their player-manager.  They lost their first game, 10–3, to Tony Mullane and the Cincinnati Reds, but won the next day. They compiled a win–loss record of 43–89 in their initial season, finishing last out of the league's eight teams, and went through two managerial changes. The season had a few bright moments: on June 6, Henry Porter threw a no-hitter, and on June 13, Sam Barkley hit for the cycle.  The franchise's only future Hall of Fame player, "Slidin'" Billy Hamilton, began his career as a part-time outfielder in 1888, and was their starting right fielder in 1889.  Bill Watkins, who had finished the 1888 season as the team's manager, stayed in that role for the full 1889 season, and guided them to an improved win–loss record of 55–82, with two ties, finishing seventh among the league's eight teams.

See also
1888 Kansas City Cowboys season
1889 Kansas City Cowboys season
Kansas City Cowboys (AA) all-time roster

References

External links
1888-9 Cowboys at Baseball Reference

American Association (1882–1891) baseball teams
Kansas City Cowboys
1888 establishments in Missouri
1889 disestablishments in Missouri
Baseball teams established in 1888
Baseball teams disestablished in 1889
Defunct baseball teams in Missouri